Yuri Konstantinovich Stepanov (June 7, 1967 – March 3, 2010) was a Russian film and theater actor, who worked at the Theater workshop of Pyotr Fomenko. He was a winner of several theatrical awards and appeared in productions of the Pyotr Fomenko Workshop, as well as a number of television series.

Death
On March 3, 2010, Yuri died in a car accident in Moscow, Russia.

Filmography

References

External links
 
 Юрий Степанов (Yuri Stepanov) - биография
 Биография на национальном кинопортале www.film.ru

1967 births
2010 deaths
Male actors from Moscow
Road incident deaths in Russia
Soviet male actors
Russian male actors
Russian Academy of Theatre Arts alumni
Burials in Troyekurovskoye Cemetery